Elaan (Translation: Declaration) is a 2005 Indian Hindi-language action thriller film. Elaan is a mission film about five characters and their plan against one man. Produced by Ganesh Jain and Ratan Jai, written and directed by Vikram Bhatt, the film stars Mithun Chakraborty, John Abraham, Rahul Khanna, Arjun Rampal,  Lara Dutta and Amisha Patel.

Plot
Modern-day secular India is held at ransom by powerful criminal Baba Sikander (Mithun Chakraborty) and his brothers, Aftab (Milind Gunaji) and Sameer (Prithvi Zutshi). They begin by demanding money from wealthy businessmen; when their victims refuse to pay, they are killed.

One of their victims is Kantilal Shah, a rich businessman, Karan Shah (Rahul Khanna) is Kantilal's adopted son. He was a mere canteen boy who was spotted and adopted by Kantilal while trying to secretly listen to a board-room discussion. He gained his father's trust over the years and was gradually given the responsibility of running the family business, much to the chagrin of his step-sister, Anjali. Upon hearing that his father's life is in danger, Karan returns from America and convinces his father not to give in to the extortionist's demands and instead ask him to provide that amount to his past victims and their families. Kantilal agrees. Then five days later, a day after his birthday, Kantilal is gunned down in the elevator along with four of his bodyguards. Anjali openly renounces Karan and asks him not to participate in her father's funeral. A shocked and devastated Karan announces to Baba that he will apprehend and bring him to justice in India, no matter where he had to look.

However, Karan finds out that Baba is hiding in Italy, which does not have an extradition treaty with India. Thus, unable to take any legal action, Karan recruits some mercenaries to go with him to Italy and help him bring Baba back to India. The first man he chooses is a suspended former police inspector, Arjun Srivastav (Arjun Rampal), who had located and brutally killed his then pregnant wife's assailants on his own and now lives as a single parent with his school-going daughter. After some persuasion from Karan and his daughter alike, Arjun agrees.

Arjun recommends that the second man involved be Abhimanyu (John Abraham), who is currently in Vashi Jail and had been Baba's chauffeur and hitman before being framed by Baba and his associates following a failed job. Abhimanyu is rescued in broad daylight by Arjun and his men, who were pretending to be doctors, on the pretext of a medical checkup (The escapade takes place dramatically, in a style adopted from the film Spy Game to spring Elizabeth Hadley (Catherine McCormack) from a Chinese prison.) Arjun and Karan convince Abhimanyu to help them with vital information about Baba and his gang in return for a heavy payment. He reluctantly agrees to do so.

The trio then go to Venice (where Baba is said to be, based on Abhimanyu's information). There, Abhimanyu meets his girlfriend Sonia (Lara Dutta) and tries backing out of the mission by passing of Sonia as Baba's girlfriend who wants a huge amount of money for the information she would supposedly provide. Thus, under this pretext, he double crosses Arjun and Karan, takes the money, and tries escaping with the money along with Sonia. Before he can do so, both he and Sonia are kidnapped by Baba and his men. Priya (Amisha Patel), a press reporter from Aaj Tak, looking for a story on Karan earlier, has followed the two there, using a satellite tracker for mobile phones. She meets them and tells them about Abhimanyu's deceit. Despite this, The three go to rescue Abhimanyu and Sonia, in a lengthy gunfight and high speed car chase. Karan and Arjun are angry at Abhimanyu's betrayal, however the latter apologizes and agrees to help them in return for their saving his life since he intends to settle scores with Salim (Chunky Pandey), one of Baba's trusted aides who had been instrumental in helping Baba set him up. The five then go and apprehend Salim and after some effort, he divulges at gunpoint that Baba is in Munich. Abhimanyu then shoots him for his betrayal. Karan finds Baba in Munich and tells him about Salim's death much to Baba's devastation, reiterating his warning that he would fulfil his promise of bringing the latter back to India at any cost.

In course of time, the group become good friends. Acting on a tip, when they go to Baba's guest house in Munich to catch him red handed, they are fooled and are then surrounded by Baba and his men. A lengthy gunfight follows, in the course of which, Arjun dies while getting into a jeep. Baba now warns Karan to leave him alone and save his own life and that of the others while there is still time. Devastated, Karan feels that bringing the others on the mission was a big mistake, much to Abhimanyu's fury. However he takes a final stand as Priya motivates him not to give up the fight at this point, reasoning that he had always been right, once when he had asked his father not to give in to Baba's demands and even now, when he had decided to gather the group to bring Baba back to India.

Karan and Abhimanyu, now go to apprehend Baba as he leaves the country through the French border. Sonia and Priya alert the French Border Police as France has an extradition treaty with India. The trick works, as Baba is cornered by Karan, Abhimanyu and the French border police just as he is crossing the border. A long and devastating gunfight ensues, at the end of which many of Baba's most trusted aides are killed. Finally, Baba is left alone and stranded after Karan stops Abhimanyu from shooting him, reasoning that the terror Baba inspired in people had to end and this would thus end Baba's life in turn.

Baba is sent to India, sentenced to death and hanged. Karan becomes a national hero for his feat. He reconciles with his sister and finally marries Priya. The couple adopt Arjun's daughter, Ayesha. Abhimanyu and Sonia also get married and settle down in Venice.

Cast
 Mithun Chakraborty as Baba Sikander
 John Abraham as Abhimanyu Singh
 Amisha Patel as Priya Desai
 Rahul Khanna  as Karan Shah
 Arjun Rampal as Arjun Srivastav 
 Lara Dutta as Sonia Singh
 Milind Gunaji as Aftab Sikander
 Chunky Pandey as Salim Haji
 Asrani as Kishorilal
 Avtar Gill as Farid Chacha
 Prithvi Zutshi as employee of kantilal shah
 Ritu Shivpuri as Anjali Shah
 Madan Joshi as Kantilal Shah
 Atul Mathur
 Swini Khara as Ayesha Srivastav (Arjun's Daughter)

Tracks list

Critical response
Namrata Joshi of Outlook India gave the film 1 out of 4, writing: "So terribly infantile and hackneyed that it seems to have been deliberately manufactured for a kindergarten audience." Jaspreet Pandohar of BBC.com gave the film 2 out of 5, writing: "Sadly, the ending is as obvious as the love story sub-plots, and you never really fear the wrath of Sikander, played by 80s Bollywood disco king Chakraborty (India's answer to John Travolta post his Saturday Night Fever heyday). Even Bhatt's execution of Matrix-style action scenes and overuse of hapless goons is predictable. What could have been a stylish vendetta flick turns out to be 'time pass' - Indian slang for average." Merril Diniz of Rediff.com wrote: "If you're a die-hard John Abraham fan, then go ahead and watch the film because he looks like a million bucks and delivers a good performance. But there's not much else to hold your interest for three whole hours."

References

External links 

 

2005 films
Films scored by Anu Malik
2000s Hindi-language films
Films directed by Vikram Bhatt